Twisted Crystal is the sixth studio album by American indie rock band Guerilla Toss. It was released on September 14, 2018 by DFA Records.

Critical reception
Twisted Crystal was met with "generally favorable" reviews from critics. At Metacritic, which assigns a weighted average rating out of 100 to reviews from mainstream publications, this release received an average score of 79, based on 8 reviews. Aggregator Album of the Year gave the release a 76 out of 100 based on a critical consensus of 9 reviews.

Track listing

Personnel

Musicians
 Kassie Carlson – vocals, violin
 Stephen Cooper – bass
 Sam Lisabeth – keyboard
 Peter Negroponte – drums
 Arian Shafiee – guitar
 Nick Forté – vocals

Production
 Josh Druckman – producer, mixing, engineer
 Joe Lambert – mastering

References

2018 albums
DFA Records albums